Michael Scheickl (born 23 March 1957) is an Austrian singer, songwriter and record producer.

In 1981, he recorded a solo album under the pseudonym Fritz. He was one half of the duo Mess, who represented Austria at the Eurovision Song Contest in 1982 with the song "Sonntag". He composed and produced many tracks as part of the Austrian trio Joy, and sang backing vocals on the album Enjoy.

References 

20th-century Austrian male singers
1957 births
Living people
Eurovision Song Contest entrants of 1982